White House High School (WHHS) is a public high school in White House, Sumner County, Tennessee. It is one of nine high schools managed by Sumner County Schools, and enrolls approximately 850 students.

Demographics
The ethnic makeup of the school is approximately 89.3% Non-Hispanic White, 4.6% Hispanic or Latino, 3.2% Non-Hispanic Black or African American, 1.7% Asian, 0.5% Native American, and 0.7% from two or more races. 
Approximately 50.2% of students are male and 49.8% are female.

Athletics
The White House High School's mascot is the Blue Devil, and its colors are royal blue and white. The school competes in the Tennessee Secondary School Athletic Association (TSSAA), and offers the following sports:
Baseball
Boys' Basketball
Girls' Basketball
Boys' Bowling
Girls' Bowling
Boys' Cross Country
Girls' Cross Country
Boys' Golf
Girls' Golf
Boys' Tennis
Girls' Tennis
Boys' Track and Field
Girls' Track and Field
Boys' Soccer
Girls Soccer
Cheerleading
Softball
Volleyball
Wrestling
Football

State championships
Baseball - 2000
Football - 1997
Girls' soccer - 2017
Girls' track and field - 2017
Wrestling - 2019

References

Schools in Sumner County, Tennessee
Public high schools in Tennessee